Vavau International Airport , also known as Lupepauu International Airport, is an airport in Vavau, Tonga.

The airport has limited direct service, currently through Fiji Airways.  Previously services had been provided by Chathams Pacific (until 2013) and Real Tonga (until 2020).

Less frequent services connect Vava’u to Ha’apai, Niuafoʻou and Niuatoputapu. Flight time is 50 minutes to Tongatapu, 30 minutes to Ha’apai and a little over one hour to both Niuatoputapu and Niuafo’u.

In October 2021 the Tongan Government announced plans for an NZ$172 million upgrade of the airport, including a longer runway, replacement terminal, and renewable energy plant. The expansion would allow direct flights from New Zealand and Australia, and be funded by a public-private partnership.

Airlines and destinations

Passenger

References 

Airports in Tonga
Vavaʻu